This article is about the particular significance of the year 1783 to Spain and its people.

Incumbents
Monarch - Charles III

Events
 January 20 - Preliminary peace treaty signed between England and Spain
 February 3 - Spain recognizes the United States of America
 November 24 – Royal Cedula of Population

Births
 April 10 - Francisco de Longa (d. 1831 or 1842)

Notable deaths
 March 2 - Francisco Salzillo, sculptor (b. 1707)
 June 1 - Domingo Elizondo, soldier (b. 1710)

 
1780s in Spain
Years of the 18th century in Spain